The Hwasong-5 is a North Korean tactical ballistic missile derived from the Soviet R-17 Elbrus missile. It is one of several missiles with the NATO reporting name Scud.

History
North Korea obtained its first R-17 missiles from Egypt in 1979 or 1980, in return for assistance during the Yom Kippur War. As relations with the Soviet Union were rather strained at the time, and Chinese assistance had proven unreliable, the North Koreans set about reverse engineering the Egyptian missiles. This process was accompanied by the construction of a missile-building infrastructure, of which the main elements were the 125 factory at Pyongyang, a research and development institute at Sanum-dong and the Musudan-ri Launch Facility.

The first missile prototypes were completed in 1984. Designated Hwasong-5, and known in the West as the "Scud Mod. A", they were identical to the R-17Es obtained from Egypt. The first test flights  occurred in April 1984, but the first version saw only limited production, and no operational deployment, as its purpose was only to validate the production process.

Production of the definitive version of the Hwasong-5 ("Scud Mod. B" or "Scud-B") began at a slow rate in 1985. The type incorporated several minor improvements over the original Soviet design. The range with a 1000 kilogram warhead was increased from 300 to 340 kilometres, and the Isayev engine was slightly modified. An array of payloads was developed, including high explosive (HE), cluster, chemical, and possibly biological warheads. Throughout the production cycle, until it was phased out in favour of the Hwasong-6 in 1989, North Korean manufacturers are thought to have carried out small enhancements, in particular to the guidance system, but the exact details are unknown.

A variant with terminal maneuverability was tested on August 26, 2017. U.S. intelligence referred to the upgraded missile as the KN-21. Although the missile's maneuverability would make it more accurate, few tests were conducted and it wasn't seen after August 2017, suggesting little progress was made and North Korea may have moved on to wholly new missile designs like the KN-23.

Export
In 1985, Iran acquired 90 to 100 Hwasong-5 missiles from North Korea in a deal worth US$500 million. As part of the deal, North Korea agreed on a missile technology transfer, and it helped Iran establish a production line. In Iran, the Hwasong-5 was produced as the Shahab-1.

The United Arab Emirates purchased a number of Hwasong-5 missiles in 1989. The missiles were decommissioned, allegedly due to unsatisfactory quality

In 2008, North Korea made a technology transfer with Myanmar. In December 2006, South Korean press reported that Daewoo signed a deal with the Myanmar government in May 2002 to build an arms factory near Pyi(Bago Division), worth US$133.8 million. Some analysts believe that this deal included the supply of some parts for missile development in Myanmar. In 2014, China confirmed to UN monitors that North Korean-made ballistic, missile-related alloy rods destined for Myanmar had been found on a ship docked in China.

See also
Hwasong-6
R-11 Zemlya
R-17 Elbrus
Scud

References

External links 
CSIS Missile Threat - Hwasong-5

Chemical weapon delivery systems
Tactical ballistic missiles
Ballistic missiles of North Korea
Korea–Soviet Union relations
Tactical ballistic missiles of North Korea
Military equipment introduced in the 1980s